The Town and Country Planning Act 1977 was an Act of Parliament in New Zealand. It repealed the Town and Country Planning Act 1953 and its amendments, as well as Section 75 of the Local Government Act 1974. Town and Country Planning Act was itself repealed by the significant, and at times controversial, Resource Management Act 1991, along with many other Acts.

The Act was administered by the Ministry of Works and Development.

See also
Law of New Zealand

References

External links
Text of the Act

Repealed New Zealand legislation
1977 in New Zealand law
Urban planning in New Zealand